Braunsia may refer to:
 Braunsia (plant), a plant genus in the family Aizoaceae
 Braunsia (wasp), an insect genus in the family Braconidae